Olof Jonsson (1918-1998) was a Swedish-American engineer and psychic.

He was born in Malmö, Sweden. He later moved to Chicago where he worked as an engineer. In 1953, he was tested in a series of ESP experiments by the parapsychologist J. B. Rhine at Duke University. He was caught cheating in the experiments.

Jonsson is most notable for his long-distance telepathy experiment during the Apollo 14 mission in 1971. Four psychics on earth were chosen to receive telepathic signals from astronaut Edgar Mitchell in space. The experiment was a complete failure.

References

Further reading
Brad Steiger. (1971). The Psychic Feats of Olof Jonsson. Prentice-Hall
Olle Holmberg. (1968). Den osannolika verkligheten. Stockholm: Bonniers

External links
Trusted Psychics

1918 births
1998 deaths
People from Malmö
American psychics
Swedish emigrants to the United States